Fiona Ayerst (born 20 September 1965) is a wildlife photographer based in South Africa notable for underwater photography. She has swum with many species of shark, photographed them, including the macropredator Tiger shark and the massive but tamer whale shark. Her images have won awards in numerous photo competitions. She writes for several magazines, and works as an editor for Beyond Blue magazine. She is a proponent of protecting sharks and ocean environments. Her images have appeared in magazines and newspapers worldwide, such as Time magazine, as well as on magazine covers and Coffee table books featuring wildlife photography. She won South Africa's 2003 Wildlife Photographer of the Year. She gave a TED talk in 2012 titled My journey into water. She is a director of Africa Media.

References

External links 
 Fiona Ayerst website
 Fiona Ayerst at Getty Images
 Ayerst's TED X talk
 Africa Media

People from Nairobi
Living people
1965 births
People from Mossel Bay
Underwater photographers
South African conservationists
South African underwater divers
Nature photographers
South African women photographers